Murrumba State Secondary College is an independent coeducational public secondary school based in Murrumba Downs in the local government area of the Moreton Bay Region, north of the Brisbane metropolitan area in Queensland, Australia. The school initially opened in 2012 as the first secondary school in Queensland to incorporate Year 7 as part of the Flying Start initiative.

Murrumba State Secondary College's role of Principal is currently held by Kerri Holzwart. The school also consists of three Deputy Principals, two Heads of School, one Business Manager, two Guidance Officers, one Information Services Manager, fifteen Leaders of Learning, six Deans of Students (one Dean per year level), 90 teaching staff and 26 support staff, giving the school a total population of 147 staff members.

Curriculum

English

English is a compulsory core subject across the Year 7–10 curriculum. English subjects available to students in Years 11 and 12 include the General subjects of General English and English Literature, and the Applied subject of Essential English.

Mathematics

Mathematics is a compulsory core subject across the Year 7–10 curriculum. Students in Years 9 and 10 have the option to undertake General Mathematics or Mathematics Extension. The subject of Specialist Mathematics is also optionally undertaken by students in Year 10 Mathematics Extension. Mathematics subjects available to students in Years 11 and 12 include the General subjects of General Mathematics, Mathematical Methods and Specialist Mathematics, and the Applied subject of Essential Mathematics.

Social Sciences

The subjects of History and Geography are administered as compulsory core subjects across the Year 7–9 curriculum. In Year 10, History remains compulsory whereas Geography becomes an elective subject. Students in Years 9 and 10 also have the opportunity to study the elective subject of Entrepreneurship Education, which prepares students for senior subjects such as Business and the Diploma of Business. Year 10 students undertaking Entrepreneurship Education can apply to receive entry into the Excellence program, The Academy of Entrepreneurship and Innovation. Social Sciences subjects available to students in Years 11 and 12 include Ancient History, Business, Geography, Legal Studies and Modern History, and the Applied subjects of Social & Community Services and Tourism.

Science

Science is a compulsory core subject across the Year 7–10 curriculum. Students in Years 9 and 10 have the option to study either General Science or Science Extension. Science subjects available to students in Years 11 and 12 include the General subjects of Biology, Chemistry, Physics and Psychology, and the Applied subject of Science in Practice.

Spanish

Spanish is the Language Other Than English studied at Murrumba State Secondary College. Spanish is studied as a compulsory subject across the Year 7–8 curriculum and becomes an elective subject from Year 9.

Spanish Acceleration

Spanish Acceleration is an Excellence program available to Year 7 students. Students in the program learn History in Spanish for at least 50% of the course and have the opportunity to explore history in Spanish and English, developing high levels of language proficiency.

Spanish Immersion

Spanish Immersion is an Excellence program available to students in Years 8–10. Students in the program receive 50-60% of the curriculum in the second language. Key Learning Areas such as Mathematics, Humanities and Food Technology Studies are taught in the second language.

Spanish Technology

Spanish Technology is a course aimed at Year 9 Spanish Immersion students. Through the use of technology, students communicate with pen-pals, exchanging
info about an itinerary in a Spanish speaking country. Furthermore, they have opportunities to create their own recording, edit information and create surveys. The course is designed to provide students with the necessary research skills needed to navigate the Spanish web, use blogs in Spanish and create their own broadcast in Spanish.

Health & Physical Education

Health & Physical Education is a compulsory core subject across the Year 7–9 curriculum. Years 9 and 10 students have the option to study either Core Health & Physical Education or Health & Physical Education Extension. From Year 10, Health & Physical Education becomes an elective subject. Health & Physical Education subjects available to students in Years 11 and 12 include the General subjects of Health Education and Physical Education, and the Applied subject of Sport & Recreation.

Football Academy

The Football Academy is an Excellence program available to students from Years 7–10. The program aims to provide a pathway to a career in football for talented secondary-aged players.

The Arts

Year 7 students undertake the Arts subjects of Visual Arts and Music, whereas Visual Arts is the only General Arts subject studied in Year 8. Year 9 Arts subjects include Dance (General or Extension), Drama, Media Arts, Music and Visual Art (General or Extension), whereas Year 10 Arts subjects include Certificate II in Music Industry (CUA20615), Dance, Drama, Media Arts, Music and Visual Art. Arts subjects available to students in Years 11 and 12 include the General subjects of Dance, Drama, Music, Visual Art and Film, Television & New Media, and the Applied subject of Arts in Practice.

High Performance Music

High Performance Music is an Excellence program for students from Years 7–10. It is designed to assist in the development of students’ all-round musicianship as well as using their passion for music to enhance their academic success. Students enrolling in the program complete an application and audition for successful entry.

Technology

Students in Year 7 study Applied Technology whereas students in Year 8 study Applied Technology and Food Technologies. Technology subjects available to Year 9 students include Engineering, Fashion & Design, Food Studies, Information Communication Technology and Product Design, whereas Year 10 Technology subjects include Design, Design & Industrial Technology, Digital Solutions, Engineering Excellence, Engineering Technology, Fashion, Food & Nutrition and Information & Communication Technology. Technology subjects available to students in Years 11 and 12 include the General Subjects of Design, Digital Solutions and Engineering, and the Applied subjects of Fashion and Industrial Graphics Skills.

Engineering Excellence

Engineering Excellence is an Excellence program for students from Years 7–10. Students in the Years 7–9 engage in a variety of different units such as Biotechnology, Design, Engineering, Environmental Engineering, Food Technology, Forensic Science, Polymers, Robotics and Sustainability. Units undertaken by Year 10 students in the program include Dynamics, Marine Engineering, Medical Engineering and Structural Analysis.

Vocational Education & Training

Vocational Education & Training (VET) courses available to Years 11 and 12 students include:

 Certificate II in Engineering Pathways (MEM20413)
 Certificate II & III in Hospitality (SIT30616)
 Certificate II & III in Sport & Recreation (SIS30115)
 Certificate III in Active Volunteering (CHC34015)
 Certificate III in Aviation & Remote Pilots License (AVI30316)
 Certificate III in Early Childhood Education & Care (CHC30113)
 Certificate III in Fitness (SIS30315)
 Diploma of Business (BSB502155)

Co-curricular activities

Co-curricular activities available to students at Murrumba State Secondary College include:
 Girls' Touch Training
 Instrumental Music Program
 Murrumba Culinary Club
 Opti-MINDS
 Rock and Water; a program that aims to enhance and promote self-respect, self-control and self-confidence.
 SciConnect; an extension of the science program which allows Year 9 Engineering Excellence Program students to mentor Year 5 and 6 students from local primary schools.
 Spanish Tutorials
 Student Volunteering and Community Service Program

References

External links
 

Public high schools in Queensland
Schools in South East Queensland
Educational institutions established in 2012
2012 establishments in Australia
Buildings and structures in Moreton Bay Region